Andriy Zhyltsov is a Paralympian athlete from Ukraine competing mainly in category T36 sprint events.

Biography
Andriy competed at both the 2000 and 2004 Summer Paralympics.  In the first he competed in the 200 m, 400 m and 4x400 m but it was in the 100 m where he won his only medal, a bronze.  In 2004 he had more success winning bronze in both the 4x100 m and 4x400 m relays, silver in the 200 m and improved in the 100 m to win the gold medal, he also competed in the long jump.

References

Paralympic athletes of Ukraine
Athletes (track and field) at the 2000 Summer Paralympics
Athletes (track and field) at the 2004 Summer Paralympics
Paralympic gold medalists for Ukraine
Paralympic silver medalists for Ukraine
Paralympic bronze medalists for Ukraine
Living people
Medalists at the 2000 Summer Paralympics
Medalists at the 2004 Summer Paralympics
Year of birth missing (living people)
Paralympic medalists in athletics (track and field)
Ukrainian male sprinters